Rupert George Pate (September 6, 1917 – May 20, 2014) was a professional American football player who played offensive lineman for three seasons for the Chicago Cardinals and Philadelphia Eagles. 

Pate attended Wake Forest College where he was chosen captain of the football team in 1939, made All-State and All-Southern Conference and played in the 1939 Blue-Gray Football Bowl. He joined the professional Chicago Cardinals team in 1940 and played with the Philadelphia Eagles in 1941–1942. He served in World War II from 1943 to 1945. Pate was elected to Goldsboro High School's Hall of Fame in 1989.

Until his death, he was one of the oldest surviving professional football players.

References

1917 births
American football offensive linemen
Chicago Cardinals players
Philadelphia Eagles players
Wake Forest Demon Deacons football players
2014 deaths
People from Goldsboro, North Carolina